The fight against crime in Ukraine is led by the Ukrainian Police and certain other agencies. Due to the hard economic situation in the 1990s, the crime rate rose steadily to a peak in 2000. Following this peak, the crime rate declined, until 2009. In that year, the world financial crisis reached Ukraine. 

In 2017, the situation with regard to crime started to improve. The preliminary crime data for 2020 are the lowest in a decade.

Statistics 

Comparison of major crime indicators per 100 000 population, 2019.

Crime by type

Murder

In 2010, Ukraine had a murder rate of 4.3 per 100,000 of population. There were a total of 1,988 murders in Ukraine in 2010. In 2017, 0.3% of Ukrainian crime was homicide. In 2016 the Ukrainian police investigated 1,707 murders and, in 2017, 1,397.

Corruption 

Corruption is a widespread and growing problem in Ukrainian society. In 2014's Transparency International Corruption Perceptions Index, Ukraine was ranked 142nd out of the 175 countries investigated (tied with Uganda and the Comoros).

Bribes are given to ensure that public services are delivered either in time or at all. Ukrainians have stated they give bribes because they think it is customary and expected. According to a 2008 Management Systems International (MSI) sociological survey, the highest corruption levels were found in vehicle inspection (57.5%), the police (54.2%), health care (54%), the courts (49%) and higher education (43.6%). On 8 June 2011, Ukrainian President Viktor Yanukovych stated that corruption costs the state budget 2.5 billion in revenues annually and that, through corrupt dealings in public procurement, 10 to 15% (US$7.4 billion) of the state budget "ends up in the pockets of officials."

According to the United States Agency for International Development (USAID), the main causes of corruption in Ukraine are a weak justice system and an over-controlling, non-transparent government combined with business-political ties and a weak civil society. Corruption is regularly discussed in the Ukrainian media.

In May 2018, Estonian President Kersti Kaljulaid stated that corruption is the primary factor holding back the development of Ukraine and that it can only be resolved with a strong political will, after a meeting with the head of the National Anti-Corruption Bureau of Ukraine (NABU), Artem Sytnyk.

Theft 

In 2017, the main segment of crime was theft, representing a 52% proportion of the total crimes in Ukraine.

Terrorism 
According to official statistics there were 126 acts of terror on Ukrainian soil every month in 2014, 108 in 2015, 155 in 2016 and 124 in 2017.

From 2014 until late 2017, 5,804 criminal cases were registered as 'acts of terror', or 129 terrorist attacks per month, on average. In this time-frame, 15 persons were convicted on charges of terrorism.

See also
 Judicial system of Ukraine
 Prisons in Ukraine
 Human trafficking in Ukraine
 Thief in law

References

External links